Elektrėnai Reservoir, located south of the city of Elektrėnai, Lithuania, is the third-biggest artificial lake in Lithuania. It was created in 1961 by damming the Strėva River. It supplies cooling water to the 1,800 MW Elektrėnai Power Plant. A number of villages were drowned by the reservoir; over 140 households were relocated. The reservoir also covered eight other lakes.

The reservoir covers about 1,264 hectares, with depths of over 30 meters.

References

Sources
 Elektrėnai, Vilnius: Jandrija, 2006

Infrastructure completed in 1961
Reservoirs built in the Soviet Union
Reservoirs in Lithuania
1961 establishments in Lithuania
RElektrenai
Elektrėnai Municipality